Laona can refer to:
 Laona Township, Winnebago County, Illinois
 Laona Township, Minnesota
 Laona, New York
 Laona, Wisconsin, a town
Laona (community), Wisconsin, an unincorporated community within the town
 Laona (gastropod), a genus of sea slugs in the family Philinidae